Pseudocalotes brevipes, the Vietnam false bloodsucker, is a species of agamid lizard. It is found in China and Vietnam.

References

Pseudocalotes
Reptiles of China
Reptiles of Vietnam
Reptiles described in 1904
Taxa named by Franz Werner